"I'm So Thankful" is a song written by Marc Gordon and Frank Wilson, and released by The Ikettes on Modern Records in 1965. It was the fourth single from The Ikettes' debut album Soul The Hits, and became their second R&B hit of the year following "Peaches 'N' Cream."

Critical reception 
The record was chosen as Cash Box's (August 7, 1965) Pick of the Week:The Iketters are a cinch to create a tremendous sales-stir with this in both the pop and r&b markets. The top lid here, "I'm So Thankful" a slow-shufflin' romantic ode about a love-sick gal who is on cloud nine since she met the fella of her dreams. Undercut, "Don’t Feel Sorry Me," is a hard-driving blues twister about a jilted lass who claims happy that her romance went kaput.

Chart performance

References 

1965 songs
1965 singles
The Ikettes songs
Modern Records singles
American pop songs
Songs written by Frank Wilson (musician)
Songs written by Marc Gordon